Ballydesmond GAA is a Gaelic Athletic Association club based in Ballydesmond in Cork, Ireland. Its Gaelic Football team participates in competitions organized by Cork GAA, and is a member of Duhallow division. The club is located very close to the border with Kerry and thus is very involved in the intense rivalry between the counties. The club consists of members with allegiances to both counties. Handball is also a prominent sport within the club. The team won the Duhallow Junior A Football Championship in 2007 and subsequently went on to win the Cork Junior County Football Championship that same year. They now compete in the Cork Intermediate Football Championship since 2008 to present. Star player Donncha O'Connor plays for the Cork Senior Football Team. He is currently the all-time top scorer for the Cork Senior Footballers.

Honours
 Duhallow Junior A Football Championship Winners (4) 1971, 1975, 1986, 2007  Runners-Up 1969, 1976, 1979, 2005
 Cork Under-21 Football Championship Runners-Up 1976

Notable players
 Donncha O'Connor

Official website
Ballydesmond GAA Official website

References

Gaelic games clubs in County Cork
Gaelic football clubs in County Cork